Villarta de los Montes is a Spanish municipality in the province of Badajoz, Extremadura. It has a population of 595 (2007) and an area of 123.3 km².

References

External links 
 Profile 

Municipalities in the Province of Badajoz